Tripylella is a genus of nematodes belonging to the family Tripylidae.

The genus has almost cosmopolitan distribution.

Species:

Tripylella australis 
Tripylella dentata 
Tripylella fatimaensis 
Tripylella incunda 
Tripylella intermedia 
Tripylella intermedia 
Tripylella iucunda 
Tripylella jianjuni 
Tripylella mexicana 
Tripylella muscusi 
Tripylella quitoensis 
Tripylella subintermedia

References

Nematodes